Robert Andrew "Bob" Kohler (17 May 1926 – 5 December 2007) was a gay rights pioneer. Born and raised in Queens, New York, Kohler was a lifelong activist in New York City. He was at the Stonewall riots, and was a friend to many of the activists in groups like the Gay Liberation Front and Street Transvestite Action Revolutionaries.

Life
Kohler served in the U. S. Navy in the South Pacific Theater during World War II, was the manager of the New York gay bathhouse, Club Baths, and was among the first agents to represent previously unknown Black artists. He owned and ran the popular gay store The Loft on Christopher Street.

Activism
Though Kohler is best known for his role at the Stonewall riots and his early involvement with the Gay Liberation Front, he was active with many movements and groups, including the Congress of Racial Equality (CORE), the Black Panther Party, Act Up, Sex Panic, the Neutral Zone, the New York City AIDS Housing Network (NYCAHN), Irish Queers, Fed Up Queers, animal rights groups, and FIERCE!

Death
Kohler died of lung cancer on December 5, 2007, at the age of 81, in the Charles Street (West Village) apartment that he had lived in for 45 years.

Notes

References
 Carter, David (2004). Stonewall: The Riots That Sparked The Gay Revolution. St. Martin's Press, New York. .
 Duberman, Martin (1993). Stonewall New York, Dutton, New York. .
 Deitcher, David (1995). The Question of Equality: Lesbian and Gay Politics in America Since Stonewall. Charles Scribner's Sons, New York.  .
 Shepard, Hayduk and Benjamin, Ronald (2002). From ACT UP to the WTO: Urban Protest and Community Building in the Era of Globalization. Verso, London. .
 Sycamore, Mattilda Bernstein (2008). That's Revolting: Queer Strategies for Resisting Assimilation. Soft Skull Press, Inc., New York City. .

External links
IrishQueers.org
Bob's Queers: Dedicated to the life, activism, and legacy of Bob Kohler

1926 births
2007 deaths
American LGBT businesspeople
LGBT people from New York (state)
American LGBT rights activists
Activists from New York (state)
HIV/AIDS activists
Activists for African-American civil rights
American anti-racism activists
Deaths from lung cancer
People from Greenwich Village
20th-century LGBT people
21st-century LGBT people